The trestle of a post mill is the arrangement of the main post, crosstrees and quarterbars that form the substructure of this type of windmill. It may or may not be surrounded by a roundhouse. Post mills without a roundhouse are known as open trestle post mills.

A trestle mill is a variety of smock mill, usually without weatherboards, formerly used for drainage in the Norfolk Broads. Examples can be found at Horning, Ludham and St Olaves.

A well preserved example of a timber crosstree, from the trestle of a medieval windmill, was excavated by archaeologists at Humberstone, near Leicester, in 2007.

References

Sources

Post mills
Smock mills